Pressure alopecia (also known as "Postoperative alopecia," and "Pressure-induced alopecia") occurs in adults after prolonged pressure on the scalp during general anesthesia, with the head fixed in one position, and may also occur in chronically ill persons after prolonged bed rest in one position that causes persistent pressure on one part of the scalp, all likely due to pressure-induced ischemia.

See also 
 Cicatricial alopecia
 List of cutaneous conditions

References

Conditions of the skin appendages